José Jorquera Gutiérrez (born 1 April 1991) is a Chilean footballer who currently plays for the Chilean Primera División club Cobresal as goalkeeper.

External links
 Profile at Cobresal's official web site
 

1991 births
Living people
Chilean footballers
Cobresal footballers
Chilean Primera División players
Association football goalkeepers